Keiskammahoek (also spelled Keiskamahoek) is a town in the Eastern Cape Province, South Africa. From 1981 until the end of apartheid, the town was part of the Ciskei bantustan.

Geography
Keiskammahoek is a small rural town that is situated some forty kilometers to the West of King William's Town in the Amahlathi Local Municipality, which is one of seven local municipalities that constitute the Amathole District Municipality, Eastern Cape. Keiskammahoek is surrounded by a number of villages and peri-urban settlements that support the town.

Keiskammahoek is situated near the headlands of the Keiskamma River catchment area. It is located in the centre of four different biomes: Albany Thicket, Grasslands, Savannah and Afromontane forest.

History
The town was once an important commercial centre for the timber and agricultural industries. The settlement of the area since the 1800s also led to the large-scale exploitation and destruction of the natural environment. The timber industry has moved towards Stutterheim and the agricultural production has declined somewhat.

Just outside the town is St Matthew's High School, one of South Africa's historic schools. Founded as a mission school by Bishop of Grahamstown John Armstrong in 1854, the school was once a particularly thriving educational centre, and the large parish church is a local landmark. A hospital and training facility for nurses was opened at the site in 1923 and the secondary school began in 1926. Like other church schools, the Anglican Church withdrew from direct involvement in the school as a result of the 1953 Bantu Education Act. The state bought much of St Matthews’ land in 1970, and in 1976 the hospital was taken over by the Ciskei government. It closed ten years later, moving to Keiskammahoek, where it became known as the SS Gida Hospital. The high school continues as a state boarding school for girls (with male day students). A small clinic remains on the school site, and the ruins of many of the school's buildings are everywhere evident.

Currently the economy of Keiskammahoek relies mainly on grants from the State. The population has been steadily declining and many villages are still without basic services such as water and sanitation. However, the town still maintains some of the remnants of the historic past and there are a number of historic buildings to be found such as the Gilead Church.

Health facility
Keiskammahoek houses the medium-sized S.S. Gida Hospital, a Provincial government funded hospital for the Amahlathi area.

Tourism
Accommodation near Keiskammahoek can be found at Cata Lodge, which is located at Cata Village 17 km outside of Keiskammahoek Town. Cata Lodge is a community-owned and -run initiative. It also offers the option of homestays, with various trained hosts in the village.

Cata Lodge is the start of the Cape Parrot Day Hiking Trail. It also offers mountain biking as well as flyfishing and bird watching.

Other

Marguerite Poland's Shades is set in a fictionalised version of Keiskammahoek and based on life at the mission station.

Notable residents
 Alice Pegler, born in Keiskammahoek in 1861, noted botanical collector
 William Greenstock, born in Keiskammahoek in 1865, international cricketer
 Membathisi Mdladlana, born in Keiskammahoek in 1952, a member of Parliament with African National Congress and longtime Minister of Labour
 Henry Taberer, born in Keiskammahoek in 1870, international cricketer
 Arthur Mzwandile Kobese born in Keiskammahoek in 1938, Mr. Arthur Kobese was one of the Founding members of Chess South Africa. He was Interim President in 1994 and 1995 and was elected President from 1996 – 2001. 
He also served as Zone 4.3 President from 1996 to 2000

References

Populated places in the Amahlathi Local Municipality
Ciskei